Chris Lafferty (born May 28, 1977) is an American professional stock car racing driver, crew chief, and former team owner of Lafferty Motorsports. He last competed part-time in the NASCAR Camping World Truck Series, driving for JJC Racing.

Racing career
After growing up in Vacaville, California, Lafferty moved to Concord, North Carolina in 1998 to pursue a racing career. In addition to working as an engine builder, he was a journalist for various racing magazines.

In 2003, he formed Lafferty Motorsports. In addition to competing in the ARCA Re/Max Series and NASCAR Craftsman Truck Series, the team ran a driver development program; members of the program included regional truck racer Russ Dugger, dirt track racing drivers Tyler Hudson and Cole Exum, and kart racers Bryan Hayberger and Andrew Broucher.

Lafferty made his Truck Series debut in 2009 at Phoenix International Raceway; he had failed to qualify in his first attempt at Martinsville Speedway.

In 2011, he ran four Truck races in a truck promoting the Tea Party movement in the buildup to the 2012 United States presidential election. In 2012, he partnered with Fox Sports to create Chris Lafferty's Motorsports TV, a biweekly television program that also featured his daughter Hannah hosting a kid-friendly segment.

Lafferty returned to ARCA in 2015 with Carter 2 Motorsports at Lucas Oil Raceway. He finished 27th after retiring on lap 98 with electrical problems.

In 2017, Lafferty joined ESPN Radio as a talk show host for The Sam and Chris Show alongside NASCAR artist Sam Bass.

Motorsports career results

NASCAR
(key) (Bold – Pole position awarded by qualifying time. Italics – Pole position earned by points standings or practice time. * – Most laps led.)

Camping World Truck Series

ARCA Racing Series
(key) (Bold – Pole position awarded by qualifying time. Italics – Pole position earned by points standings or practice time. * – Most laps led.)

References

External links
 
 
 
 

1977 births
NASCAR drivers
NASCAR crew chiefs
NASCAR team owners
Living people
People from Vacaville, California
Racing drivers from North Carolina
ARCA Menards Series drivers